Jiangyuan District is a district of the city of Baishan, Jilin province, People's Republic of China.

Administrative Divisions
There are seven towns and four townships.

Towns:
Sunjiabaozi, Wangou, Songshu, Sanchazi, Zhazi, Shiren, Dayangcha

Townships:
Dashiren Township, Dashipengzi Township, Yumuqiaozi Township

References

External links

Baishan
County-level divisions of Jilin